Le Puley is a commune in the Saône-et-Loire department in the region of Bourgogne-Franche-Comté in eastern France.

Geography
The main roads are connecting the village to Germagny and Genouilly to the south and Saint-Micaud to the north.

Main sights
The romanesque priory "Saint Christophe" (12th century), protected in 1973 by the French National Heritage as a Monument historique. The belltower collapsed on the building in 1877, causing major damages.

See also
Guillaume des Autels who used to own a château named "des Hôtels" in le Puley.
Communes of the Saône-et-Loire department

References

Communes of Saône-et-Loire